Wayne Morgan (born 10 July 1955) is an Australian cricketer. He played in five first-class matches for Queensland between 1979 and 1981.

See also
 List of Queensland first-class cricketers

References

External links
 

1955 births
Living people
Australian cricketers
Queensland cricketers
Cricketers from Queensland